Zymophilus is a genus of Bacillota bacteria classified within the class Negativicutes.

References

Negativicutes
Gram-negative bacteria
Bacteria genera